Sergey Semyonovich Sobyanin (born 21 June 1958) is a Russian politician, serving as the 3rd Mayor of Moscow since 21 October 2010.

Sobyanin previously served as the Governor of Tyumen Oblast (2001–2005), Head of the presidential administration (2005–2008) and Deputy Prime Minister of Russia (2008–2010 in Vladimir Putin's Second Cabinet). Sobyanin is a member of the ruling United Russia political party, and is elected to its higher governing bodies, current member of presidium of Regional Council of the United Russia in Moscow and the head (political council secretary) of the party's Moscow branch from March 2011 to December 2012.

He is considered to be a close ally to Russian billionaire businessman Vladimir Bogdanov, Director General of Surgutneftegas.

As the Mayor of Moscow, Sobyanin has gradually relaxed the massive construction projects of his predecessor Yury Luzhkov, for which he has won acclaim for the "most sane piece of city planning in years." As mayor, Sobyanin created Moscow Media, a holding company for a number of TV channels, radio stations, and newspapers, owned and controlled by the Moscow government. And he has also won praise for his efforts in combatting corruption. At the same time, Sobyanin was criticized for the banning of pride parades in the city, for which he was strongly condemned by LGBT groups.

Early life and career
Sergey Sobyanin was born in an ethnic Mansi village of Nyaksimvol in the Khanty-Mansi Autonomous Okrug (then in the Russian SFSR of the Soviet Union).

After finishing a local school in Beryozovsky District in 1975, Sobyanin matriculated to the Kostroma Technology Institute in Kostroma. On graduation he received an assignment to the large tube-rolling factory in Chelyabinsk. He started working as a machinist there. From 1982 to 1984 he worked with Komsomol in Chelyabinsk.

In 1984, he returned to Kogalym. There, he worked as a vice-chairman of the Kogalym selsovet (lowest level of administrative subdivision in rural areas), in a municipal economy department and local tax administration.

In 1989, he got a second degree in jurisprudence (All-Union Correspondence Institute of Law). His PhD thesis was titled "Legal position of the autonomous okrugs as federal subjects of Russia". On 23 May 2007, at the Institute of Legislation and Comparative Jurisprudence at Government of Russia, defence of Sobyanin's higher doctoral thesis "RF subject in economical and social development of the state" were to take place on the basis of his monograph published shortly before the event. But the defence was cancelled due to an unknown reason. Examination of Dissernet of Sobyanin's doctoral thesis and the monograph of 2007 exposed high level of plagiarism.

Political career

In 1991, he was elected mayor of Kogalym.

Since 1993, he has been the First Deputy of the Head of the Administration of the Khanty–Mansi Autonomous Okrug.

In 1994, he was elected chairman of the Khanty–Mansi Duma.

In January 1996, he became a member of the Federation Council of Russia.

Since July 1998, he has been chairman of the Constitutional Law, Judicial, and Legal Problems Committee.

On 27 October 1996, he was re-elected as a delegate and a chairman of the Khanty–Mansi Duma.

On 12 July 2000 he was appointed the First Deputy of Plenipotentiary of President of Russia in the Urals Federal District.

On 14 January 2001 he was elected governor of Tyumen Oblast. During the campaign, oil tycoon Vladimir Bogdanov was its confidant.

He has been a member of the Supreme Council of the United Russia political party since 2004.

In 2005, Sergey Sobyanin sent a request to the President of Russia about a vote of confidence. That was done in case of the change of the governor assignment procedure. Vladimir Putin nominated him for election by the Duma of the Tyumen Oblast and he was finally reelected on 17 February 2005.

In November 2005, he was appointed a head of the Administration of the President of Russia.

Since 21 October 2010, he has been the Mayor of Moscow.

Awarded a Medal of Honour, church IInd stage order of St. Kniaz Danil Moscowskiy, Medal of Honour in Education, French Republic Medal of Honour in Agriculture.

Laureate of the "2003 Russia's Man of the Year: Politician" prize.

Mayor of Moscow

City planning 
The preservation organization Archnadzor criticized Sobyanin for his razing of historical landmarks to make way for contemporary buildings. In March 2012, Sobyanin garnered controversy for doing little to clean up the city side walks. The City of Moscow has invested considerable resources in beautification and pedestrianization of the City Center. Under the plan, 12,500 trees were planted, sidewalks were widened and redone in granite pavers, the city center got 20 km of protected cycling lanes, decorative street lighting and Velobike a new public bike share system. A total of 2,600 private building facades were renovated as part of the beautification initiative.

Moscow Urban Renewal Initiative
Moscow Urban Renewal Initiative involves the demolition of dilapidated five-story blocks of flats known as Khrushchevka and the relocation of their residents to modern high-rise housing. The project's aim is to identify and demolish Khrushchevka which are often hazardous and unfit for living and replace them with higher density modern and safe structures. The program stipulates providing the residents of buildings put on the demolition list with equivalent living space with amenities in new buildings in their district.

The list of buildings in the program includes the demolition and replacement more than 5,000 housing blocks with a total area of about 16,000,000 square metres and about 1.6 million residents.

Moscow gay parades
In February 2011, Sobyanin drew the ire of LGBT groups when he deemed Pride Parades to be "illegal" in Moscow.
In response, several gay organizers ran a parade without approval in May 2011, during which 30 gay supporters were arrested, including several foreigners.

British actor Ian McKellen criticised Sobyanin for the ban on parades, describing Sobyanin as a "coward".

Public perception
According to an independent poll, most Muscovites believe that since coming to power, Sobyanin's leadership has not differed from that of Yury Luzhkov.

Sanctions 

In July 2022 the EU imposed sanctions on Sergey Sobyanin in relation to the 2022 Russian invasion of Ukraine.

Personal life
Sergey Sobyanin was married to Irina Sobyanina, a cousin of the Minister for Energy in Mikhail Kasyanov's Cabinet, Alexander Gavrin. They divorced on 21 February 2014.

The couple have two daughters. He is of Russian and Mansi ancestry.

Notes

External links

Official biography 

 
1958 births
Living people
1st class Active State Councillors of the Russian Federation
People from Beryozovsky District, Khanty-Mansi Autonomous Okrug
United Russia politicians
Russian nationalists
Anti-Ukrainian sentiment in Russia
21st-century Russian politicians
Kremlin Chiefs of Staff
Mayors of Moscow
Governors of Tyumen Oblast
Russian engineers
Soviet politicians
Komsomol
Mansi people
Kutafin Moscow State Law University alumni
Specially Designated Nationals and Blocked Persons List
Russian individuals subject to the U.S. Department of the Treasury sanctions
Russian individuals subject to European Union sanctions